The following is a list of Bethune–Cookman Wildcats men's basketball head coaches. The Wildcats have had 13 coaches in their 82-season history.

Bethune–Cookman's current head coach is Reggie Theus. He was hired in July 2021 to replace Ryan Ridder, who left to take the same position at UT Martin.

References

Bethune–Cookman

Bethune–Cookman Wildcats men's basketball coaches